"Abrazos, no balazos" is a Spanish-language anti-war slogan, commonly translated as "Hugs, not bullets" (though "balazo" is more literally "gunshot"), and often compared to the English "Make love, not war". The slogan was initially associated with the Chicano counterculture of the 1960s, and figured prominently in the Mexican-American anti-war movement, as a slogan in opposition to United States involvement in the Vietnam War.

It later became more broadly used throughout Mexican and Mexican-American culture. Andrés Manuel López Obrador, 65th President of Mexico, used the slogan to describe his security policy during the campaign season of the 2012 Mexican general election. The general idea being that he would "moralize" police forces widely seen as brutal and corrupt within the context of the Mexican drug war.

References

Pacifism
Political catchphrases
Counterculture of the 1960s
1960 neologisms
Chicano
Opposition to United States involvement in the Vietnam War
Mexican-American culture